Phos dedonderi is a species of sea snail, a marine gastropod mollusk in the family Nassariidae, the true whelks.

References

 Fraussen K. & Poppe G.T. (2005) Revision of Phos and Antillophos (Buccinidae) from the Central Philippines. Visaya 1(5): 76-115
 Dekkers A.M. & Dekker H. (2020). A new small Phos-like genus and species Microphos palogai (Gastropoda: Nassariidae: Photinae) from the Philippines. Gloria Maris. 59(3): 98-101

External links

Nassariidae
Gastropods described in 2005